Rod Brown (born October 6, 1963) is a former American football defensive back who played two seasons with the Ottawa Rough Riders of the Canadian Football League (CFL). He played college football at Oklahoma State University. Brown was also a member of the Denver Broncos and Dallas Texans.

College career
Brown played for the Oklahoma State Cowboys from 1981 to 1984. He was a consensus All-American in 1984 after recording fifty tackles, six interceptions, eight pass deflections, one sack and one fumble recovery. He also earned First-team All-Big Eight honors in 1984. Brown was named to the Oklahoma State Football All-Century Team by The Oklahoman in 1999.

Professional career
Brown spent the 1985 season with the Denver Broncos of the National Football League. He signed with the CFL's Ottawa Rough Riders in April 1987 and played in 32 games for the team from 1987 to 1988. He played for the Dallas Texans of the Arena Football League (AFL) during the 1993 season. Brown was tied for third in the AFL with seven interceptions.

References

External links
Just Sports Stats
College stats

Living people
1963 births
American football defensive backs
Canadian football defensive backs
African-American players of American football
African-American players of Canadian football
Oklahoma State Cowboys football players
Denver Broncos players
Ottawa Rough Riders players
Dallas Texans (Arena) players
All-American college football players
Players of American football from Texas
People from Gainesville, Texas
21st-century African-American people
20th-century African-American sportspeople